Luini is a surname. Notable people with the surname include:

Aurelio Luini (c. 1530-1593), Italian painter and draughtsman
Bernardino Luini (c. 1480/82–1532), Italian painter
Elia Luini (born 1979), Italian rower
Giulio Cesare Luini (1512- after 1565), Italian painter
Sergio Luini (born 1972), Italian Olympic gymnast
Sofía Luini (born 1992), Argentine tennis player
Tommaso Luini, Italian painter